Mount Tiantai may refer to:

 Tiantai Mountain, a Buddhist holy mountain in Tiantai County, Zhejiang, China, the origin of Tiantai/Tendai/Cheontae Buddhism.
 Mount Tiantai (Sichuan), a mountain in Sichuan, China.
 Mount Tiantai (Taiwan), a mountain in Penghu County, Taiwan.
 Mount Tiantai (Vietnam), a mountain in Bắc Ninh Province, Vietnam; Thiên Thai Mountain in Vietnamese.

See also 
 Tiantai (disambiguation)
 Tiantaishan railway station, located near the Tiantai Mountain in Tiantai County, Zhejiang, China.